Joseph E. Birkett (born February 13, 1955) is an appellate court judge on the Illinois Appellate Court – Second District.  He was appointed by the Illinois Supreme Court in December 2010, and was subsequently elected to a full term in November 2012. His current term runs through December 2022.  Prior to being elevated to the bench, Justice Birkett was the State's Attorney of DuPage County, an office he had held since 1996.

Biography
Birkett is one of 10 children on Chicago's West side. His father died when he was 13. He attended St. Phillip High School, and Aurora Central Catholic High School where he was football team captain and Most Valuable Player. He went on to attend North Central College, where he earned a B.A. in Political Science and English in 1977. He received his Juris Doctor from John Marshall Law School in 1981, where he placed first in the Intramural Moot Court Competition.

He was the Assistant State's Attorney of Dupage County from 1981 to 1985, Chief of Major Crimes Unit from 1988 to 1986, Deputy Chief of Criminal Division from 1986 to 1991, Chief of Criminal Division from 1991 to 1996, and has served as DuPage County State's Attorney since then. He was first elected in November 1996, then re-elected in 2000 and 2004.

Birkett gained national attention when he prosecuted Marilyn Lemak in 1999 for the murders of her three children. Lemak is currently serving a life sentence.

He has been married to Patricia Hill since July 9, 1977, and has two children, Nick and Jackie. He is a resident of Wheaton and attends St. Daniel The Prophet Catholic Church in Wheaton.  His brother-in-law is George Wendt, who is married to Birkett's sister Bernadette.

2002 run for Attorney General
In 2002, Birkett ran for Illinois Attorney General against Democrat Lisa Madigan. Madigan defeated Birkett in the November 7, 2002 General Election with 50% of the vote to Birkett's 47%.

2006 run for Lieutenant Governor

Judy Baar Topinka named Birkett as her running mate on December 9, 2005. On March 21, 2006, he defeated Steve Rauschenberger, Sandy Wegman, and Lawrence Bruckner in the Republican Party's primary. Topinka also won her primary race. In the November 7, 2006 General Election, Democrats Rod Blagojevich and Pat Quinn defeated Topinka and Birkett, as well as the Green Party's Rich Whitney and Julie Samuels.

Appellate Court Judge
On November 2, 2010, the Illinois Supreme Court appointed Joe Birkett to serve as Appellate Court Judge on the Second District Appellate Court, replacing Justice Jack O'Malley, who retired. He was sworn in on December 13, 2010.

Controversy

Rolando Cruz case

In 2002 Birkett's role in the wrongful prosecution of Rolando Cruz, subsequently exonerated by DNA evidence in the murder of 10-year-old Jeanine Nicarico, was partly responsible for his loss to Democrat Lisa Madigan in the race for Illinois attorney general.

2007–08 Prosecution of Iraq War protesters
On July 18, 2007, The Naperville Sun published an editorial calling the state's attorney's disorderly conduct charges against two war protestors "heavy-handed". The editorial opined:It is hard to believe that the criminal charges against Sarah M. Hartfield, 45, of Naperville and Jeff Zurawski, 39, of Downers Grove are not at least to some extent politically inspired in nature...We also suspect that had the banner read "Support Bush and Cheney" instead of "Impeach Bush and Cheney – LIARS" the situation would have been viewed a little differently.
Supporters of the defendants staged three rallies at the DuPage County courthouse. The charges were dropped when the chief witness failed to appear in court. Jeff Zurawski called the prosecution "vindictive" and requested a public apology.

References

External links

1955 births
Living people
Judges of the Illinois Appellate Court
Illinois Republicans
People from Wheaton, Illinois
North Central College alumni
Politicians from Chicago
District attorneys in Illinois
John Marshall Law School (Chicago) alumni